Tobias Schröter (born 12 May 1964) is a former German pair skater. With partner Babette Preußler, he won the bronze medal at the 1984 East German Figure Skating Championships. The pair finished 11th at the 1984 Winter Olympics, sixth at that year's European Figure Skating Championships, and ninth at that year's World Figure Skating Championships.

Schröter later teamed up with Katrin Kanitz. They won the gold medal at the East German Championships in 1986 and 1987 and the bronze medal at the 1987 European Championships.

Results

With Preußler

With Kanitz

References 
 Sports-Reference.com profile

1964 births
German male pair skaters
Figure skaters at the 1984 Winter Olympics
Olympic figure skaters of East Germany
Living people
Sportspeople from Dresden
European Figure Skating Championships medalists